The Amalgamated Textile Warehousemen's Association was a trade union representing workers in the textile industry in the United Kingdom, principally in Lancashire.

The union was founded in 1894 as the Amalgamated Society of Clothlookers and Warehousemen, and initially had just 203 members across five autonomous branches.  These branches were in Blackburn, Burnley, Bury, Colne and Nelson, Great Harwood and Padiham.  Early in the 1900s, these branches established greater co-ordination and the organisation was renamed the General Amalgamation of Clothlookers and Warehousemen.  New district associations were established in other towns in Lancashire and Cheshire on the initiative of the amalgamation, and by 1910 it had 21 branches with 2,790 members.

In 1913, the association took its best-known name, the "Amalgamated Textile Warehousemen's Association", and membership rose rapidly, to a peak of 11,000 in 1921.  By the 1970s, it was losing members rapidly due to redundancies in the industry.  It changed its name again to the Amalgamated Textile Warehouse Operatives Association, and developed strong links with the Amalgamated Textile Workers Union, the two sharing a general secretary.

Most of the association's branches amalgamated or left the association in the early 1980s.  The Amalgamated Textile Workers' Union itself merged into the General, Municipal, Boilermakers and Allied Trades Union (GMBATU) in 1985, and the Warehouse Operatives was dissolved the following year.  Two remaining affiliates, in Bolton and Hyde, then merged into GMBATU, while Colne merged into GMBATU only in 1990, Nelson dissolved in 1991, and Padiham continued in existence.

General Secretaries
1896: W. Riley
1900s: Edward Strong
1926: John Lee
1950: Thomas Ashe
1971: Frank Walker
1972: A. Birtwistle
1970s: Jack Brown

References

Cotton industry in England
Defunct trade unions of the United Kingdom
Cotton industry trade unions
1894 establishments in the United Kingdom
1986 disestablishments in the United Kingdom
Trade unions established in 1894
Trade unions disestablished in 1986
GMB (trade union) amalgamations
Trade unions based in Lancashire